Richard Foxton was an English Member of Parliament.

He was a Member (MP) of the Parliament of England for Leicester in 1334.

References

Year of birth missing

Year of death missing
14th-century deaths
14th-century English people
People from Leicester
Members of the Parliament of England (pre-1707)